Bokaro may refer to:
 Bokaro Steel City, an industrial city in Jharkhand, India
 Bokaro district, in Jharkhand, India
 Bokaro (Thermal), a census town of Bokaro in Jharkhand, India
 Bokaro (Vidhan Sabha constituency)
 Bokaro River, a river in the Indian state of Jharkhand
 West Bokaro Coalfield
 East Bokaro Coalfield
 Bokaro Thermal Power Station B